The following is a list of  things named in the memory of the German scholar and polymath Hermann Grassmann:

Color science
Grassmann's laws

Mathematics
Grassmann algebra
Grassmann bundle
Grassmann dimensions
Grassmann graph
Grassmann integral 
Grassmann number
Grassmann variables
Grassmannian
Affine Grassmannian
Affine Grassmannian (manifold)
Lagrangian Grassmannian
Grassmann–Cayley algebra
Grassmann–Plücker relations

Linguistics
Grassmann's law

Grassmann